Frank Parker defeated Jaroslav Drobný 6–4, 7–5, 5–7, 8–6 in the final to win the men's singles tennis title at the 1948 French Championships.

Seeds
The seeded players are listed below. Frank Parker is the champion; others show the round in which they were eliminated.

  Frank Parker (champion)
  József Asbóth (second round)
  John Bromwich (first round)
  Eric Sturgess (semifinals)
  Marcel Bernard (quarterfinals)
  Jaroslav Drobný (finalist)
  Budge Patty (semifinals)
  Giovanni Cucelli (quarterfinals)
  Frank Sedgman (fourth round)
  Dragutin Mitić (fourth round)
  Tony Mottram (fourth round)
  Josip Pallada (fourth round)
  Philippe Washer (fourth round)
  Lennart Bergelin (quarterfinals)
  Marcello Del Bello (quarterfinals)
  Wladyslaw Skonecki (second round)

Draw

Key
 Q = Qualifier
 WC = Wild card
 LL = Lucky loser
 r = Retired

Finals

Earlier rounds

Section 1

Section 2

Section 3

Section 4

Section 5

Section 6

Section 7

Section 8

References

External links
   on the French Open website

1948 in French tennis
1948